Villa Independencia Airport  is an airport serving the Uruguay River port town of Fray Bentos in the Río Negro Department of Uruguay. The airport is on the south edge of the town.

See also

 List of airports in Uruguay
 Transport in Uruguay

References

External links
 HERE Maps - Fray Bentos
 OpenStreetMap - Fray Bentos
 OurAirports - Villa Independencia Airport

Airports in Uruguay
Fray Bentos